Belur may refer to:

Places
 Belur, Karnataka, a town in Karnataka, India
 Belur temple (Chennakeshava temple), Belur
 Belur, Tamil Nadu, a town in Salem district, Tamil Nadu, India
 Belur, West Bengal, a neighbourhood of Howrah, India
 Belur Math, the headquarters of the Ramakrishna Mission, located in Belur, West Bengal
 Belur railway station

People
 Belur Ravi
 Belur V. Dasarathy